TW Hydrae b is a likely extrasolar planet orbiting the young T Tauri star TW Hydrae approximately 176 light-years (54 parsecs, or nearly  km) away in the constellation of Hydra. It is likely a Neptune-like planet orbiting at a distance of nearly 22 AU from its star.

Characteristics

Mass, radius and temperature
TW Hydrae b is an ice giant, an exoplanet with a radius and mass close to that of the ice giants Neptune and Uranus. It has an estimated mass of around 22.72  (or 1.5 MNeptune) and a possible radius of 4.25 .

Host star
The planet orbits a (K-type) T Tauri star named TW Hydrae. The star has a mass of 0.8  and a radius of 1.1 . It has a temperature of 4000 K and is about 9 million years old. In comparison, the Sun is 4.6 billion years old and has a temperature of 5778 K. Its luminosity is 28% of that of the Sun.

The star's apparent magnitude, or how bright it appears from Earth's perspective, is 11.27. Therefore, it is too dim to be seen with the naked eye.

Orbit
TW Hydrae b orbits its host star at a distance of 22 AU (somewhat less than the orbital distance of Neptune from the Sun, which is 30.11 AU). The orbital period is not known, although taken its similar orbital distance as Neptune, the orbital period may be around the same value.

Discovery

First claims
In December 2007, a team led by Johny Setiawan of the Max Planck Institute for Astronomy in Heidelberg, Germany announced discovery of a planet orbiting TW Hydrae, dubbed "TW Hydrae b" with a minimum mass around 1.2 Jupiter masses, a period of 3.56 days, and an orbital radius of 0.04 astronomical units (inside the inner rim of the protoplanetary disk). Assuming it orbited in the same plane as the outer part of the dust disk (inclination 7±1°), it would have a true mass of 9.8±3.3 Jupiter masses. However, if the inclination was similar to the inner part of the dust disk (4.3±1.0°), the mass would be 16 Jupiter masses, making it a brown dwarf. Since the star itself is so young, it was presumed this was the youngest extrasolar planet yet discovered, and essentially still in formation. (only surpassed by K2-33b and V830 Tau b, both discovered nearly 9 years later).

Disproven status
In 2008 a team of Spanish researchers concluded that the planet did not exist: the radial velocity variations were not consistent when observed at different wavelengths, which would not occur if the origin of the radial velocity variations was caused by an orbiting planet. Instead, the data was better modelled by starspots on TW Hydrae's surface passing in and out of view as the star rotates. "Results support the spot scenario rather than the presence of a hot Jupiter around TW Hya". Similar wavelength-dependent radial velocity variations, also caused by starspots, have been detected on other T Tauri stars.

New proposal
In 2016, astronomers studying the protoplanetary disk of the star began to speculate why there was small dust grains in the gaps, including the one at 22 AU, but not large dust grains. Further investigations began to suggest that there may be a 1.5 MNeptune ice giant orbiting within the gap at 22 AU, which would be responsible for the observed gaps.

The study was then published in the online journal archive arXiv on September 1, 2016, gaining wide interest from media outlets.

Notes

References 

Hydra (constellation)